Alexander Abasheli was a pen name of Isaac Chochia (ისააკ ჩოჩია) (August 15, 1884 – September 27, 1954), a Georgian poet and prose writer.

Born into a peasant family in Sachochio (now Abashispiri), near Abasha, he was involved in the 1905 Russian Revolution and was exiled to Solvychegodsk in 1906. Returning to Georgia in 1908, he wrote for local press and had his first lyrics published first in Russian, and then in Georgian. He came under the influence of then-fashionable trends of Symbolism, with his first collection of lyrics "The Smile of the Sun" (მზის სიცილი; 1913) being impregnated with what has been described by critics as the "cult of the Sun".

An outright hostility towards the Soviet regime established in Georgia in 1921 plunged his poetry into decadence characterized with the sense of hopelessness, and disappointment in the revolutionary ideas of his youth. However, with the exacerbation of political repressions in the Soviet Union, Abasheli adopted a more conformist line and gradually became fully accommodated to the Soviet ideological dogmas to the point of collaborating with Grigol Abashidze in writing the original lyrics for the Anthem of the Georgian SSR which contained, among other things, a panegyric to Joseph Stalin.

Abasheli is also remembered as an author of the first Georgian science fiction novel "A Woman in the Mirror" (ქალი სარკეში; 1930). Several of his poems were translated into Russian by Boris Pasternak.

References 

Mikaberidze, Alexander (ed., 2007). Abasheli, Alexander. Dictionary of Georgian National Biography. 
 Chilaia, S. (1975), ალექსანდრე აბაშელი (Alexander Abasheli). In: ქართული საბჭოთა ენციკლოპედია (Georgian Soviet Encyclopedia), Vol. 1, p. 17.

External links 
 Женщина в зеркале. Russian translation of "A Woman in the Mirror" by Alexander Abasheli.

1884 births
1954 deaths
20th-century male writers
20th-century novelists
20th-century poets from Georgia (country)
People from Samegrelo-Zemo Svaneti
People from Kutais Governorate
Recipients of the Order of the Red Banner of Labour
Male poets from Georgia (country)
Novelists from Georgia (country)
Speculative fiction writers from Georgia (country)
Soviet science fiction writers
Soviet male writers
Burials at Didube Pantheon